Nebraska Legal Marijuana NOW is a political third party in the U.S. state of Nebraska established in 2016 as the state affiliate of the Legal Marijuana Now Party.

In 2022, Legal Marijuana NOW Party ran more candidates for Nebraska statewide offices than the Democratic Party recruited. Their candidate for Attorney General, Larry Bolinger, got 188,648 votes, more than 30 percent, the highest percentage for a statewide Nebraska candidate running outside the two major parties in 86 years, when independent George Norris was reelected to U.S. Senate.

History

Background

Earning ballot access

In 2016, the Nebraska Legal Marijuana NOW Party petitioned to be recognized as a major political party. To make the ballot, Legal Marijuana NOW Party needed valid signatures equal to at least one-percent of the total votes cast for governor in 2014, or 5,397 signatures statewide.
In July, 2016, volunteers turned in 9,000 signatures to the Nebraska Secretary of State. However, the Secretary of State said that half of the signatures were invalid, falling short of the 5,397 needed.

After failing to make it onto Nebraska ballots in 2016, the party began circulating petitions for 2020 ballot access for a Nebraska Legal Marijuana NOW Party in September, 2016. The party planned to collect 15,000 signatures for their second attempt at gaining ballot access.

Nebraska Legal Marijuana NOW Party leaders submitted their petition to the Secretary of State on September 18, 2020. The party needed to collect the signatures of 6,800 registered Nebraska voters in order to qualify as an official state party. According to Elworth, they turned in 15,000 signatures, just to be safe.

2021—2023
The Nebraska Secretary of State initially told petition drive organizers, Elworth and Krystal Gabel, on January 7, 2021, that the Legal Marijuana NOW Party petition was short by 28 signatures from Nebraska's 2nd congressional district, which includes Omaha.

On April 21, 2021, after the Secretary of State reviewed some petition signatures that were challenged, Legal Marijuana NOW gained official recognition as a state political party in Nebraska, earning the party ballot access for their candidates, and allowing Legal Marijuana NOW Party to register voters. Gabel, the national Legal Marijuana Now Party chairperson, told a reporter for the Star-Herald that the party is running several candidates in Nebraska at multiple levels of government, from United States Congress to local sheriffs.

In 2022, Nebraska Legal Marijuana NOW Party ran more candidates, two, for statewide offices than the Nebraska Democratic Party recruited, one. The Libertarian Party also found more candidates, three. Only the Republican Party had candidates in all five Nebraska constitutional races in 2022.

Larry Bolinger was nominated by Legal Marijuana NOW to run for Nebraska Attorney General in 2022. Bolinger, a resident of Alliance, Nebraska, focused on legalization of marijuana and expanding drug courts in the race to unseat Doug Peterson, who was seeking his third term as attorney general.

During a radio interview on February 14, 2022, Bolinger, who entered public work by serving a term on the Alliance Planning Commission, said “The way the Republican and Democratic parties have been treating each other over the past several years, they’re just full of hate and vinegar. And it’s kind of disgusting. I decided to go with this new party and just support the system how it’s supposed to be. We’re supposed to work together to make things right for the people.”

Bolinger received 188,648 votes, 30.27%, in the 2022 Attorney General race, the highest percentage for a statewide Nebraska candidate running outside the two major parties in 86 years, when independent George W. Norris was reelected to U.S. Senate. Bolinger was one of the top two third party vote-getters, in the US.

Results in Nebraska state elections

Results in federal elections

Further reading
 Chitwood, Joe (July 12, 2017) Pro-pot party petition drive reaches North Platte North Platte Bulletin
 Summers, Brandon (June 19, 2020) Elworth leaving Democrats for Legal Marijuana Now Party The Grand Island Independent
 Kiser, Danielle (March 24, 2022) ABC TV 10:00 PM News, Legal Marijuana NOW Party hosts its first rally of the year KLKN

See also
 Cannabis political parties of the United States

References

External links

 facebook.com/MJPNE
 March 24, 2022, KLKN 8 ABC TV 10:00 PM News, “Legal Marijuana NOW Party hosts its first rally of the year.”

2016 establishments in Nebraska
Cannabis law reform organizations based in the United States
Cannabis political parties of the United States
Drug policy organizations based in the United States
Single-issue political parties
Political parties established in 2016
Political parties in Nebraska
Progressive parties in the United States
Social democratic parties in the United States